Jerome Harmon (born September 25, 1968), better known as J-Roc, is an American songwriter and music producer from Fort Worth, Texas. He frequently collaborates with Timbaland. Jerome Harmon has produced for Beyoncé, Justin Timberlake, Jay-Z, Chris Brown, Keri Hilson, Ashlee Simpson, Mario, Nelly Furtado, Jamie Foxx, Michael Jackson, Kat Dahlia and Chris Cornell.

Early career
J-Roc spent years on the session circuit, where his first credits include playing organ and keyboard on early Kirk Franklin's albums including Kirk Franklin and the Family, Whatcha Lookin' 4, and Kirk Franklin & the Family Christmas. In 1998, J-ROC co-produced five songs on Wayman Tisdale's critically acclaimed album Decisions. J-Roc worked with Royal Court productions and then with Timbaland's production company in 2007, and contributed to Timbaland's solo album Shock Value as well as Bobby V's album Special Occasion, co-producing the single "Anonymous".

Selected production discography

2018

Justin Timberlake - Man of the Woods
 "Young Man"

2017

Kat Dahlia
 "Sirens"
 "Friday Night Majic"

2016

Fantasia – The Definition of...
 "Crazy"

2014

Jennifer Hudson – JHUD
 "Walk It Out" (featuring. Timbaland)

Michael Jackson – Xscape
 "Chicago"
 "Loving You"
 "Slave to the Rhythm"
 "Do You Know Where Your Children Are?"
 "Blue Gangsta'"
 "Love Never Felt So Good" (featuring. Justin Timberlake)

Missy Elliott
 "9th Inning" (featuring. Timbaland)
 "Triple Threat" (featuring. Timbaland)

2013

Beyoncé – Beyonce
 "Drunk in Love" (featuring. JAY-Z)
 "Blow"
 "Partition"
 "Rocket"
 “Jealous”

Justin Timberlake – The 20/20 Experience – 2 of 2
 Gimme What I Don't Know (I Want) (featuring. Timbaland)
 True Blood (featuring. Timbaland)
 Cabaret (featuring. Drake & Timbaland)
 TKO (featuring. Timbaland)
 Take Back the Night (featuring. Timbaland)
 Murder (featuring. JAY-Z & Timbaland)
 Drink You Away
 You Got it On
 Amnesia
 Only When I Walk Away (featuring. Timbaland, James Fauntleroy II & Brenda Radney)
 Not a Bad Thing
 Electric Lady (featuring. Timbaland)

JAY-Z – Magna Carta... Holy Grail
 Holy Grail (featuring. Justin Timberlake)
 Tom Ford
 Picasso Baby (featuring. The-Dream & Zofia Borucka Moreno)
 FuckWithMeYouKnowIGotIt (featuring. Rick Ross)
 F.U.T.W.
 Versus
 Heaven (featuring. Justin Timberlake)
 Part II (On the Run) (featuring. Beyoncé Knowles)
 JAY-Z Blue
 La Familia

Justin Timberlake – The 20/20 Experience
 Pusher Love Girl 
 Suit & Tie (featuring. JAY-Z & Timbaland)
 Don't Hold the Wall (featuring. Timbaland)
 Strawberry Bubblegum (featuring. Timbaland)
 Tunnel Vision (featuring. Timbaland)
 Spaceship Coupe
 That Girl (featuring. Timbaland & The Tennessee Kids)
 Let the Groove Get In
 Mirrors
 Blue Ocean Floor

Robin Thicke – Blurred Lines
 Take It Easy on Me

Cher – Closer to the Truth
"I Don't Have To Sleep To Dream"

2012

Chris Brown – Fortune
"Trumpet Lights"
"Tell Somebody"

2011

Chris Brown – F.A.M.E.
"Paper Scissors Rock" (featuring. Timbaland & Big Sean)

Demi Lovato – Unbroken
"All Night Long" (featuring. Missy Elliott & Timbaland)

Free Sol – No Rules
"Fascinated" (featuring. Justin Timberlake & Timbaland)

Chris Cornell – Songbook
"As Hope and Promise Fade"
"Ground Zero"

2010

Keri Hilson – No Boys Allowed
"Breaking Point"
"Beautiful Mistake"
"Lie to Me" (featuring. Timbaland)

Michelle Branch – Getaway 
"Getaway" (featuring. Timbaland)

Keysha Cole – Calling All Hearts 
"Last Hangover"

2009

Chris Cornell – Scream
"Part of Me" (featuring. Timbaland)
"Time"
"Sweet Revenge"
"Get Up"
"Ground Zero"
"Never Far Away"
"Take Me Alive" (featuring. Justin Timberlake)
"Long Gone" (featuring. Timbaland)
"Scream" (featuring. Timbaland)
"Enemy"
"Other Side of Town"
"Climbing Up The Walls"
"Watch Out"
"Two Drink Minimum" (included as a hidden track inside of "Watch Out")
"Ordinary Girl" (Deluxe Edition)
"Lost Cause" (UK Deluxe Edition)
"Do Me Wrong" (Japan Bonus Track)
"Stop Me" (Used for promotional services by Verizon Wireless, not included on album)
"Love Comes Down' (unreleased)
"Why Do You Follow Me?" (unreleased)

Ginuwine – A Man's Thoughts 
"Get Involved" (featuring. Missy Elliott & Timbaland)

Jay-Z – The Blueprint 3 
"Reminder"
"Off That" (featuring. Drake)
"Venus VS. Mars" (featuring. Beyoncé Knowles)

Timbaland – Timbaland Presents Shock Value II 
"Carry Out" (featuring. Justin Timberlake)
"Lose Control" (featuring. JoJo)
"Say Something" (featuring. Drake)
"Tomorrow in the Bottle" (featuring. Chad Kroeger & Sebastian)
"We Belong to the Music" (featuring. Miley Cyrus)
"Morning After Dark" (featuring. SoShy & Nelly Furtado)
"Can You Feel It?" (featuring. Esthero)
"Ease Off the Liquor"
"Timothy Where You Been" (featuring. Jet)
"Long Way Down" (featuring. Daughtry)
"The One I Love" (featuring. Keri Hilson & D.O.E.)
"Symphony" (featuring. Bran'Nu, D.O.E. & Attitude)

Shakira – She Wolf 
"Give It Up To Me" (featuring. Lil Wayne)

2008

The Pussycat Dolls – Doll Domination
"Halo"
"Whatchamacallit"
"In Person"
"Magic"

Ashlee Simpson – Bittersweet World
"Outta My Head (Ay Ya Ya)"
"Rule Breaker"
"Ragdoll"
"Bittersweet World"
"What I've Become"
"Murder"
"Never Dream Alone"

Jamie Foxx – Intuition
"I Don't Need It" (featuring. Timbaland)

2007

Bobby V – Special Occasion
"Anonymous" (featuring. Timbaland)
"Rearview (Ridin')"

Mario – Go!
"No Definition"

2006

Fred Hammond – Free to Worship
"Simply Put"
"More of You"

Awards and Accolades 
 2015 BMI R&B/Hip Hop Award for Most Performed Songs "Drunk in Love", "Partition" (by Beyonce), "Tom Ford", and "Part II (On the Run)" (by Jay Z)
 2015 BMI Pop Music Award for "Holy Grail" by Jay Z featuring Justin Timberlake
 2015 BMI Pop Music Award for "Not A Bad Thing" by Justin Timberlake
 57th Grammy Award Winner for Best R&B Song for "Drunk In Love" by Beyoncé
 57th Grammy Award Winner for Best RnB Performance for "Drunk In Love" by Beyoncé
 57th Grammy Award Winner for Best Contemporary RnB Album for "Drunk In Love" by Beyoncé(credited as album personnel) (credited as album personnel)
 57th Grammy Award Winner for Best Surround Sound Album for "Drunk In Love" by Beyoncé(credited as album personnel) (credited as album personnel)
 56th Grammy Award Winner for Best R&B Song for "Pusher Love Girl" by Justin Timberlake
 2014 BMI R&B/Hip-Hop Awards – "Top Producers"
 54th Grammy Award for Best R&B Album for "FAME" by Chris Brown (credited as album personnel)
 50th Grammy Award for Best Contemporary Gospel Album for "Free to Worship by Fred Hammond(credited as album personnel) (credited as album personnel)
 2007 Grammy Award for Best Contemporary R&B Gospel Album "Free to Worship" by Fred Hammond(credited as album personnel) (credited as album personnel)
 2011 BMI Pop Music Award for "Carry Out" by Timbaland featuring Justin Timberlake
 2011 BMI Urban Music Awards for "Say Something" by Timbaland featuring Drake
 Award/Event: 38th GMA Dove Awards for Best Contemporary Gospel Album of the Year for Free to Worship by Fred Hammond

Composing and Songs in Film 
 Underscore for "Real Steel"
 Motion picture trailer use of "Reminder" by Jay-Z from The Blueprint 3 in the motion picture "The Hangover Part II"

Composing and Songs in Commercials 
 "Grown Woman" by Beyoncé for Pepsi (2013)
 "Get Away" by Michelle Branch featuring Timbaland for BMW Mini (2012)

Philanthropy 
On receiving a Grammy award for the song, "Pusher Love Girl" by Justin Timberlake, J-Roc highlighted the need for funding the arts in education.

"Let's support our school system and the arts programs because we are losing it… we need a lot more people accepting awards like this."

Jerome "J-Roc Tha Ghost" Harmon was also awarded the State's Flag for his work in music by The Texas House of Representatives and in weeks to follow he established five music scholarships in his name while receiving the Keys to the City of Crane, Texas.

References

External links 
 Jerome Harmon's MySpace Page
 Timbalandmusic.com
 JeromeHarmonProductions.com

1973 births
Living people
People from Dallas
Record producers from Texas